No. 266 (Rhodesia) Squadron RAF was a squadron of the Royal Air Force.

History

First World War & Russian Civil War

The squadron was formed from RFC / RAF Nos 437 and 438 Flights at Mudros, Greece on 27 September 1918  to carry out anti-submarine patrols in that area, flying Short 184s and 320s along with Felixtowe F.3s. It was withdrawn on 27 August 1919 and disbanded on 1 September 1919 at Novorossisk.

Second World War
The squadron was reformed on 30 October 1939 at RAF Sutton Bridge as a fighter squadron, one of the Rhodesian gift squadrons and was named 266 (Rhodesia) Squadron in honour of the gift. Originally it was equipped with the Fairey Battle light bomber but soon after in January 1940 it received the Supermarine Spitfire and became a fighter squadron. It was in action over Dunkirk in early June and fought in the Battle of Britain. To rest the squadron it was moved north to RAF Wittering to carry out patrols over France.

In January 1942 the squadron moved to RAF Duxford and re-equipped with the Hawker Typhoon. The squadron changed role to fighter-bomber in support of the Normandy invasion and flew also armed reconnaissance missions in support of the invasion forces. The squadron moved along with the armies and was disbanded at Hildesheim, Germany on 31 July 1945.

In May 1944 the squadron was based at Needs Oar (Needs Ore) Advanced Landing Ground at Beaulieu in the New Forest, they were one of four such RAF British and Commonwealth squadrons flying Hawker Typhoons based here in the build-up to D-Day.  About 150 aircraft were based here in the build-up to D-Day, along with over 900 ground crew. During the spring and summer of 1944, it is estimated that the airfield was so busy that aircraft took off or landed every 45 seconds. As with many of the ALGs along the south coast, the airfield was vacant by July and would not be used as an airfield again. No. 266 Squadron were visited by the Rhodesian Prime Minister on 18 May 1944.

Into the jet age
The squadron re-formed at RAF Boxted on 1 September 1946 when 234 Squadron was renumbered. It was now a fighter squadron operating the Meteor F.3 twin-jet fighter. After a move to RAF Tangmere, Sussex two years, later the squadron converted to Meteor F.4s. The squadron was disbanded when it was re-numbered to 43 Squadron on 11 February 1949. On 14 July 1952 the squadron was reformed at Wunstorf, flying the de Havilland Vampire and later the de Havilland Venom for ground attack & night battle operations. The squadron moved on 16 October 1955 to RAF Fassberg, West Germany for a year before going back again to Wunstorf, where it was disbanded on 16 November 1957.

Bloodhound missiles
The last time the squadron reformed was on 1 December 1959 at Rattlesden to operate the Bristol Bloodhound anti-aircraft missile until it was finally disbanded on 30 June 1964.

Aircraft and missiles operated

In fiction
266 Squadron RFC is the squadron in which Captain James Bigglesworth serves in the Biggles stories that are set in the First World War.

See also
 List of Royal Air Force aircraft squadrons

References

Notes

Bibliography

 Halley, James J. The Squadrons of the Royal Air Force & Commonwealth, 1918–88. Tonbridge, Kent, UK: Air-Britain (Historians) Ltd., 1988. .
 Jefford, C.G. RAF Squadrons, a Comprehensive Record of the Movement and Equipment of all RAF Squadrons and their Antecedents since 1912. Shrewsbury, Shropshire, UK: Airlife Publishing, 2001. .
 Rawlings, John D.R. Coastal, Support and Special Squadrons of the RAF and their Aircraft. London: Jane's Publishing Company Ltd., 1982. .

External links

 Squadrons of the Battle of Britain. Aircraft, badges and history – 266 to 312 Squadrons
 266 sqn in the battle of Britain
 squadron history
 aircraft and markings

Military units and formations established in 1918
266
1918 establishments in the United Kingdom
Military units and formations of Southern Rhodesia in World War II